"Feel Alright" is a hip-hop song by Kardinal Offishall. It was the third single from his third album Fire and Glory. A music video, directed by RT!, was released for the single.

Track listing

12" single
A-side

"Feel Alright" (Clean)
"Feel Alright" (Main)
"Feel Alright" (Instrumental)

B-side

"E.G.G." (Clean) (featuring Vybz Kartel)
"E.G.G." (Main) (featuring Vybz Kartel)
"E.G.G." (Instrumental)

Chart positions

References

External links
"Feel Alright" music video

2005 songs
2006 singles
Kardinal Offishall songs
Songs written by Kardinal Offishall